The 10th Pan American Games were held in Indianapolis, Indiana, United States, from 7 August to 23 August 1987.

Results by event

Football

Group C

See also
Paraguay at the 1988 Summer Olympics

Nations at the 1987 Pan American Games
1987
1987 in Paraguayan sport